"I Sings" is the second single by gospel duo Mary Mary. Gospel rapper BB Jay is the featured rapper in this song. This single promoted Mary Mary's debut album, Thankful.

Track listing
 Radio edit (Without rap)
 Darkchild Remix (No rap)
 Shackles (Don West Remix featuring Mila Don)
 Focus Remix

Music video
Mary Mary also shot a music video for I Sings. The entire music video takes place inside a night club in which Mary Mary sing. Gospel rapper BB Jay takes the third verse while he dances at the club. Brandy and Sisqo also make a cameo during the video.

Chart positions

References

2001 singles
Mary Mary songs
Song recordings produced by Warryn Campbell
Songs written by Warryn Campbell
Music videos directed by Sanaa Hamri
Song recordings produced by Rodney Jerkins
2001 songs
Columbia Records singles